The 2022 Urawa Red Diamonds season is the club's 72nd season in existence and the 22nd consecutive season in the top flight of Japanese football. In addition to the domestic league, Urawa Red Diamonds participated in this season's editions of the Emperor's Cup, the J.League Cup, the Japanese Super Cup and the AFC Champions League.

Players

First-team squad 

Type 2
Type 2
Type 2
Type 2

Out on loan

Pre-season and friendlies

Competitions

Overall record

J1 League

League table

Results summary

Results by round

Matches 
The league fixtures were announced on 21 January 2022.

Source: J.League

Emperor's Cup

J.League Cup

Quarter-finals

Semi-finals

Japanese Super Cup

AFC Champions League

Group stage

Knockout stage

Goalscorers

References

External links 
 Official website 

Urawa Red Diamonds seasons
Urawa Red Diamonds